Spy Kids (stylised as SPY kids) is a 2001 American spy action comedy film written, edited and directed by Robert Rodriguez, who co-produced the film with Elizabeth Avellán. The film stars Alexa PenaVega, Daryl Sabara, Danny Trejo, Antonio Banderas, Carla Gugino, Alan Cumming, Teri Hatcher, Cheech Marin, Robert Patrick, Tony Shalhoub and Mike Judge.

The first installment in the Spy Kids film series, the film was theatrically released in the United States on March 30, 2001, by Dimension Films. It grossed $147 million worldwide and holds a 93% approval rating on Rotten Tomatoes. The film was nominated for Best Fantasy Film at the 28th Saturn Awards, but lost to The Lord of the Rings: The Fellowship of the Ring.

Three sequels were released: Spy Kids 2: The Island of Lost Dreams in 2002; Spy Kids 3-D: Game Over in 2003; and Spy Kids: All the Time in the World in 2011. An animated series based on the films, Spy Kids: Mission Critical, premiered in 2018.

Plot 

Gregorio and Ingrid Cortez are spies with two children, Carmen and Juni, whom they shield from their lives to protect them from inherent danger. They work for the OSS doing office consultant work, but are suddenly called back to active field work to find missing agents. Gregorio suspects children's television host Fegan Floop has kidnapped them, mutating them into his "Fooglies" – creatures on his show. The children are left in the care of their uncle, Felix Gumm.

The couple is captured by Floop's "Thumb-Thumbs", robots whose arms, legs, and heads resemble oversized thumbs, and taken to his castle. Felix is alerted to the parents’ capture, activates the fail-safe, and tells the children the truth about their parents, and that he is not their uncle, but an agent sent to watch over them. The house is attacked by Ninja Thumb-Thumbs, and Felix is captured while the children escape alone on the submarine, the NIX Super Guppy, set to autopilot to a safe house.

At the safe house, the children accept that their parents were spies and decide to rescue them. Inside Floop's castle, he introduces his latest creation, small child-shaped robots, to Mr. Lisp. They plan to replace the world leaders' children with these super-strong robots to control the world. The androids have no artificial intelligence yet, so they can't function outside their regular programming. Lisp is furious, demanding usable androids.

Floop, with his second-in-command Alexander Minion, interrogates Gregorio and Ingrid about 'The Third Brain'. Ingrid knows nothing of it, while Gregorio claims he had destroyed the brain years ago. After Floop leaves, Gregorio reveals to Ingrid that the Third Brain was a secret OSS project he had worked on: an AI brain with all the skills of the entire OSS. The project was scrapped as being too dangerous, but Gregorio didn't want to destroy the final prototype.

At the safe house, Carmen and Juni are visited by OSS agent Ms. Gradenko. Giving Carmen a bracelet as a sign of trust, she asks about the Third Brain, but she doesn't know anything. Gradenko orders the house to be dismantled, and Juni sees Ninja Thumbs outside destroying the submarine because she works for Floop. With Gradenko's intentions revealed, Juni accidentally exposes the Third Brain, and a BuddyPack chase ensues. Carmen gets the brain, and she and Juni escape. She realizes too late the bracelet from Gradenko has a tracking device, and she and Juni are attacked by their robot counterparts. Though Juni tries to destroy it, he can't, so the robots take the Third Brain and fly away.

Meanwhile, back at the castle, Gregorio tells Ingrid that Minion used to work for the OSS, but was fired after he reported him tampering with the Third Brain project. With it, Floop can achieve his goal, but he wishes to continue his children's show. Minion has different plans and takes over, locking Floop inside his "virtual room", the chamber where he films his television series. Carmen and Juni receive reluctant help from Gregorio's estranged brother Isador "Machete" Cortez when they show up at his spy shop. He refuses to accompany them, so they steal some gear and take his spy plane, the RX Express, to fly to Floop's castle. After a few mishaps, Carmen and Juni eject themselves from the plane before it crashes into the castle, and they enter via the underwater entrance.

While their children infiltrate the castle, Juni rescues Floop who helps him and Carmen release their parents. Together they trap Minion in Floop's Fooglies machine, mutating him into a Fooglie, and, confronting Lisp and Gradenko, the family is beset by all 500 robot children. Machete busts through the window, reconciling with Gregorio and joining the family to fight. However, at the last moment, Floop reprograms the robots to change sides. The 500 super-strong robots quickly overpower Minion, Lisp, and Gradenko. With advice from Juni, Floop introduces the robot versions of Carmen and Juni on his show. At home, some time later, the family's breakfast is interrupted by Devlin, the head of the OSS, with a mission for Carmen and Juni. The children tell him they will only accept if all the Cortezes can work on the mission together as a family.

Cast 
 Alexa Vega as Carmen Cortez, the daughter of Gregorio and Ingrid. Vega also portrays Carmen's robotic counterpart Carmenita.
 Addisyn Fair as Infant Carmen Cortez
 Daryl Sabara as Juni Cortez, Carmen's brother and the son of Gregorio and Ingrid. Daryl also portrays Juni's robotic counterpart Junito.
 Danny Trejo as Isador "Machete" Cortez, a gadget inventor, Juni and Carmen's uncle, and Gregorio's estranged brother
 Antonio Banderas as Gregorio Cortez, retired OSS agent, now a consultant worker and father to Juni and Carmen
 Carla Gugino as Ingrid Cortez, retired OSS agent turned consultant worker and Gregorio's wife, mother to Juni and Carmen
 Alan Cumming as Fegan Floop, the host of Floop's Fooglies
 Teri Hatcher as Ms. Gradenko, a former OSS agent turned associate of Mr. Lisp and Minion
 Cheech Marin as Felix Gumm, an OSS agent who pretends to be Carmen and Juni's uncle
 Robert Patrick as Mr. Lisp, a businessman
 Tony Shalhoub as Alexander Minion,  Floop's assistant (A Fooglie in a Human Disguise)
Additionally, Mike Judge portrays Donnagon Giggles, George Clooney portrays Devlin, Kara Slack portrays Carmen's friend Leticia, Evan Sabara portrays 'Intruder' Spy Kid, Angela Lanza portrays Newscaster, Richard Linklater portrays Cool Spy, Johnny Reno portrays Agent Johnny, Guillermo Navarro portrays Pastor, and Charles Crocker portrays Thumb People.

Production 

Robert Rodriguez's first family-oriented production was the short film Bedhead (1991); since the release of El Mariachi (1992) a year later, he desired to make the same type of full-length family features as he experience in his childhood. He wanted a product that felt like it was written, directed, and produced by a kid. His initial plan for that type of film was children initially not knowing their parents were spies until they had to save their captured parents, and an antagonist with the juvenile fantasticism of Willy Wonka. He noted the villains' imaginativeness was the man who seems to be the main bad guy at first turns into a protagonist and his comedic sidekick becomes the main villain. Designs such as the Thumb Thumbs were drawings Rodriguez did as an adolescent.

Tony Shalhoub joined the project as a Robert Rodriguez fan and a father of two children wanting to act in a children's film. After reading the script, he met Rodriguez and his wife Elizabeth Avellán, and was shown concept drawings of designs and animations for the actor to get an idea of the style of the film. When acting, Shalhoub's experience of reading books and playing with his kids enabled him to view Rodriguez's child-like scenarios from the perspective of his children. Elizabeth Olsen auditioned for a role.

The distorted heads growing out of Alexander Minion when mutated by the machines were gel molded by Rodriguez and, according to Shalhoub, very lightweight.

Most of Spy Kids 48 days of filming was in Austin, Texas, although some exterior shots were done in South America.

Music 

The film score is written by John Debney and Danny Elfman, with contributions from a variety of others, including director Robert Rodriguez and Marcel Rodriguez. Among Elfman's contributions is "Floop's Song (Cruel World)", which is performed by Cumming. Los Lobos covers the Tito Puente song, "Oye Como Va" (adapted as "Oye Como Spy" by David Garza and Robert Rodriguez). The song was nominated for "Outstanding Song in a Motion Picture Soundtrack" at the 2002 ALMA Awards. The closing theme, "Spy Kids (Save the World)", is performed by the Los Angeles indie pop band, Fonda.

The score won an award at the ASCAP Film and Television Music Awards.

 "Cortez Family" (Gavin Greenaway, Heitor Teixeira Pereira, Harry Gregson-Williams) – 1:39
 "My Parents Are Spies" (Danny Elfman) – 2:09
 "Spy Wedding" (Los Lobos, Robert Rodriguez) – 2:11
 "Spy Kids Demonstration" (John Debney, R. Rodriguez, Marcel Rodriguez) – 1:06
 "Parents on Mission" (Debney, Elfman, Greenaway, Pereira) – 1:17
 "Kids Escape House" (Greenaway, Pereira) – 3:14
 "Pod Chase" (Debney, Elfman, Gregson-Williams) – 1:38
 "The Safehouse" (Debney, Elfman) – 0:47
 "The Third Brain" (Debney, R. Rodriguez, M. Rodriguez) – 1:00
 "Buddy Pack Escape" (Elfman) – 1:39
 "Oye Como Spy" (Davíd Garza, Tito Puente, R. Rodriguez) Performed by Los Lobos – 2:59
 "Floop's Song (Cruel World)" (Elfman) Performed by Alan Cumming – 0:59
 "Spy Go Round" (Greenaway, Pereira, M. Rodriguez) – 2:11
 "Minion" (Chris Boardman, Greenaway, Pereira, R. Rodriguez) – 1:03
 "Sneaking Around Machetes" (Elfman) – 0:35
 "The Spy Plane" (Debney, Elfman) – 1:29
 "Floop's Castle" (Boardman) – 1:29
 "Final Family Theme" (Gregson-Williams) – 1:44
 "Spy Kids (Save the World)" (Emily Cook, David Klotz, Dave Newton) Performed by Fonda – 2:20

Release

Marketing
In March 2001, Spy Kids screened for exhibitors at the ShoWest in Las Vegas.

Spy Kids was the first film to be promoted as a part of a two-year deal between Miramax and Pop Secret signed in June 2001. Formalized thanks to the successes of Spy Kids and Bridget Jones's Diary (2001), the deal stated annually, and for five films, Pop Secret popcorn would be present at theater screenings and as tie-ins for video releases. For Spy Kids, Pop Secret popcorn was in theaters for the August re-release, while on home video Pop Secret Special Editions were issued that came with collectibles and tickets to win prizes. Target also offered purchasers of Spy Kids copies free Pop Secret popcorn.

Former promotion executive vice president at Miramax, Lori Sale, admitted the McDonalds tie-ins for the first three Spy Kids were the three best of the company.

Extended version 
A special edition with a deleted scene was released to theaters on August 8, 2001. It was also supposedly released in specially marked Kellogg's boxes for a limited time in Canada, alongside three other movies. There were plans to release the special edition to DVD but it never materialized, despite the fact that a director's commentary and interviews were already recorded for it. However, that version is available on the film's Blu-ray re-release, which was released on August 2, 2011 for both the series' tenth anniversary and to coincide with the fourth film.

Reception

Box office 
Spy Kids opened theatrically in 3,104 venues on March 30, 2001, earning $26.5 million in its first weekend and ranking first in the North American box office. It held the number one spot for three weeks before being toppled by the second weekend earnings of Bridget Jones's Diary, which was also released by Miramax. The film ultimately grossed $112.7 million in the United States and Canada, and $35.2 million internationally for a worldwide total of $147.9 million.

Critical response 
On Rotten Tomatoes, Spy Kids has a 93% approval rating based on 129 reviews and an average rating of 7.2/10. The site's critical consensus reads: "A kinetic and fun movie that's sure to thrill children of all ages". On Metacritic it has a score of 71 out of 100 based on 27 reviews, indicating "generally favorable reviews". Audiences polled by CinemaScore gave the film an average grade of "A" on an A+ to F scale.

Roger Ebert of the Chicago Sun-Times gave it 3.5 out of 4 stars and called it "a treasure". He wrote: "Movies like Spy Kids are so rare. Families are often reduced to attending scatological dumber-and-dumbest movies like See Spot Run--movies that teach vulgarity as a value. Spy Kids is an intelligent, upbeat, happy movie that is not about the comedy of embarrassment, that does not have anybody rolling around in dog poop, that would rather find out what it can accomplish than what it can get away with". Mick LaSalle of the San Francisco Chronicle wrote: "It's entertaining and inoffensive, a rare combination in kids' films, which are usually neither". Lael Loewenstein of Variety observed: "A full-blown fantasy-action adventure that also strenuously underscores the importance of family, Spy Kids is determined to take no prisoners in the under-12 demographic, a goal it sometimes dazzlingly achieves. Robert Rodriguez's film, in which two kids become real spies to save the world from a mad genius, fulfills kids' empowerment fantasies and features enough techno-wizardry and cool f/x to satisfy those weaned on videogames".

Accolades

Legacy 
Retrospective pieces consider Spy Kids significant in 2001 for starring a Latino secret-agent family. Shalhoub added other reasons it was a unique family film: "I don't think there was anything ever like this before. So it had that whole component going for it, too. It was comedic. It was a little creepy in places. I think it had a bit of a darker side. It just checked a lot of boxes".

Vulture writer Iana Murray positively described Spy Kids, with oddities like the Thumb-Thumbs, as an example of an era where films "could just be weird without having to explain themselves". She called Shalhoub's performance of the best in the film, reasoning he plays "everything so hilariously straight-faced that it only enhances the chaos around him".

Other media

Sequels

Novelization 
Talk Miramax Books released a novelization of the movie in March 2001. The novel was written by children's book author Megan Stine. The posters and end of the credits even say "Read the Talk/Miramax Books", telling the viewers to read the print retelling.

Notes

References

External links 

 
 
 

2001 films
2000s adventure comedy films
American adventure comedy films
American children's comedy films
American children's adventure films
American spy comedy films
American spy action films
2000s English-language films
Spy Kids
Films about kidnapping
Films shot in Austin, Texas
Films shot in Chile
Films shot in San Antonio
Films shot in Texas
Miramax films
Dimension Films films
Troublemaker Studios films
Films scored by John Debney
Films scored by Danny Elfman
Films scored by Harry Gregson-Williams
Films scored by Heitor Pereira
Films scored by Robert Rodriguez
Films directed by Robert Rodriguez
Films produced by Elizabeth Avellán
Films produced by Robert Rodriguez
Films with screenplays by Robert Rodriguez
2000s spy comedy films
2000s children's comedy films
2001 comedy films
Films set in castles
2000s American films